WWLW is a classic hits formatted broadcast radio station licensed to Clarksburg, West Virginia, serving North Central West Virginia.  WWLW is owned and operated by West Virginia Radio Corporation.

References

External links
Sky 106.5 Online

1973 establishments in West Virginia
Classic hits radio stations in the United States
Radio stations established in 1973
WLW